Curtis House may refer to:

United States 
(by state, then town)
Curtis House (Demopolis, Alabama), listed on the National Register of Historic Places (NRHP) in Marengo County, Alabama
Morgan-Curtis House, Phenix City, Alabama, listed on the NRHP in Russell County, Alabama
Curtis Cottage, Prescott, Arizona, listed on the NRHP in Prescott, Arizona
Upper Wade and Curtis Cabin, Dinosaur, Colorado
Curtis Hardware Store, Paonia, Colorado, listed on the NRHP in Delta County, Colorado
Sanford-Curtis-Thurber House, Newtown, Connecticut
Nathaniel Curtis House, Stamford, Connecticut
Curtis Mansion, Newark, Delaware, listed on the NRHP in New Castle County, Delaware
Curtis Paper Mill Workers' Houses, Newark, Delaware, listed on the NRHP in New Castle County, Delaware
William E. Curtis House, Tampa, Florida, listed on the NRHP in Florida
Charles Curtis House, Topeka, Kansas, listed on the NRHP in Shawnee County, Kansas
Elijah P. Curtis House, Metropolis, Illinois, listed on the NRHP in Illinois
Gen. Samuel R. Curtis House, Keokuk, Iowa, listed on the NRHP in Lee County, Iowa
George M. Curtis House, Clinton, Iowa, listed on the NRHP in Clinton County, Iowa
Hakins-Stone-Hagan-Curtis House, Kirksville, Kentucky, listed on the NRHP in Madison County, Kentucky
Nathaniel C. & Frances Curtis, Jr., House, Orleans Parish, Louisiana, listed on the NRHP in Orleans Parish, Louisiana
Curtis-Shipley Farmstead, Ellicott City, Maryland, listed on the NRHP in Maryland
Paul Curtis House, Medford, Massachusetts, listed on the NRHP in Massachusetts
Allen Crocker Curtis House-Pillar House, Newton, Massachusetts, listed on the NRHP in Massachusetts
William Curtis House (Newton, Massachusetts), listed on the NRHP in Massachusetts
Noah Curtis House, Quincy, Massachusetts, listed on the NRHP in Massachusetts
Thomas Curtis House, Quincy, Massachusetts, listed on the NRHP in Massachusetts
Uri B. Curtis House-Tasker L. Oddie House, Tonopah, Nevada, listed on the NRHP in Nevada
Uri B. Curtis House, Tonopah, Nevada, listed on the NRHP in Nevada
Drake-Curtis House, Cochecton, New York, listed on the NRHP in New York
Curtis-Crumb Farm, Hilton, New York, listed on the NRHP in New York
Thomas Bennett Curtis House, Starkey, New York, listed on the NRHP in New York
William A. Curtis House, Raleigh, North Carolina, listed on the NRHP in Wake County, North Carolina
Sawyer-Curtis House, Little Hocking, Ohio, listed on the NRHP in Washington County, Ohio
Walter Curtis House, Little Hocking, Ohio, listed on the NRHP in Washington County, Ohio
William D. Curtis House, Sandusky, Ohio, listed on the NRHP in Sandusky, Ohio
Alice Ghormley Curtis House, Amarillo, Texas, listed on the NRHP in Potter County, Texas
Miller-Curtis House, Belton, Texas, listed on the NRHP in Bell County, Texas
Genevieve & Alexander Curtis House, Salt Lake City, Utah, listed on the NRHP in Salt Lake County, Utah
David W. and Jane Curtis House, Fort Atkinson, Wisconsin, listed on the NRHP in Jefferson County, Wisconsin
Curtis-Kittleson House, Madison, Wisconsin, listed on the NRHP on Dane County, Wisconsin

See also
Curtis Arboretum
Curtis Building, Brockton, Massachusetts
Curtiss House (disambiguation)
William Curtis House (disambiguation)